Louise Ewonde Epassi  is a Cameroon footballer who plays as a centre-back for V.League 1 club Thanh Hóa.

Honours

Coton Sport
Cameroon Premiere Division: 2011, 2013, 2014, 2015

References

External links 

1988 births
Living people
Cameroonian footballers
Association football central defenders
Expatriate footballers in Vietnam
Cameroonian expatriate footballers
SHB Da Nang FC players
V.League 1 players
People from Garoua